Berkeley is an inner-ring suburb of St. Louis, located in St. Louis County, Missouri, United States. The population was 8,228 at the 2020 census. Portions of St. Louis Lambert International Airport are within the city limits.

History
Berkeley incorporated in 1937. The community was named after Berkeley Acres, a planned community.

Geography

Demographics

Note: the US Census treats Hispanic/Latino as an ethnic category. This table excludes Latinos from the racial categories and assigns them to a separate category. Hispanics/Latinos can be of any race.

2020 census
As of the 2020 census, 8,228 people and 3,534 households were living in the city. The racial makeup (including Hispanics) of the city was 76.8% African American, 11.4% White, 0.5% Native American, 0.7% Asian, 4.8% other races, and 5.6% two or more races. 6.6% were of Hispanic or Latino origin.

2010 census
As of the census of 2010, there were 8,978 people, 3,275 households, and 2,310 families living in the city. The racial makeup of the city was 81.8% African American, 14.3% White, 3.5% Hispanic or Latino, 0.4% Asian, 0.2% Native American, 0.1% Pacific Islander, 1.6% from other races, and 1.7% from two or more races made up its population.

There were 3,275 households, of which 42.3% had children under the age of 18 living with them, 25.6% were married couples living together, 37.7% had a female householder with no husband present, 7.2% had a male householder with no wife present, and 29.5% were non-families. 24.9% of all households were made up of individuals, and 8.3% had someone living alone who was 65 years of age or older. The average household size was 2.74 and the average family size was 3.26.

The median age in the city was 32.3 years. 30.5% of residents were under the age of 18; 9.6% were between the ages of 18 and 24; 25.7% were from 25 to 44; 23.4% were from 45 to 64; and 10.8% were 65 years of age or older. The gender makeup of the city was 44.9% male and 55.1% female.

2000 census
As of the census of 2000, there were 10,063 people, 3,600 households, and 2,588 families living in the city. The racial makeup of the city was 76.69% African American, 20.64% White, and 1.60% from two or more races. Hispanic or Latino of any race were 1.08% of the population.
And 0.37% Asian, 0.26% Native American, 0.02% Pacific Islander, and 0.43% from other races made the city's population.

There were 3,600 households, out of which 37.3% had children under the age of 18 living with them, 32.2% were married couples living together, 33.8% had a female householder with no husband present, and 28.1% were non-families. 23.9% of all households were made up of individuals, and 7.8% had someone living alone who was 65 years of age or older. The average household size was 2.76 and the average family size was 3.25.

In the city the population dispersal was 32.2% under the age of 18, 9.3% from 18 to 24, 27.8% from 25 to 44, 19.8% from 45 to 64, and 11.0% who were 65 years of age or older. The median age was 31 years. For every 100 females, there were 81.7 males. For every 100 females age 18 and over, there were 74.9 males.

The median income for a household in the city was $32,219, and the median income for a family was $34,148. Males had a median income of $29,511 versus $24,338 for females. The per capita income for the city was $13,788. About 17.0% of families and 19.3% of the population were below the poverty line, including 29.0% of those under age 18 and 10.8% of those age 65 or over.

Economy
Boeing Integrated Defense Systems is headquartered in Berkeley. Prior to its merger with Boeing, McDonnell Douglas was headquartered in the same complex in Berkeley. Boeing chose to locate the defense systems offices in the St. Louis area because of the metropolitan area's central location in the United States, the role of the space and aircraft programs of the former McDonnell Douglas location, and bipartisan support from area politicians. At the site, Boeing maintains the James S. McDonnell Prologue Room, containing a museum exhibition of Boeing memorabilia. Boeing moved its defense unit to Arlington, Virginia in 2017.

Education
Berkeley is within the Ferguson-Florissant School District. Airport Elementary School and Holman Elementary School serve separate sections of Berkeley and are within the city. Elementary schools outside of Berkeley serving sections of the city include Johnson-Wabash in Ferguson and Walnut Grove in Calverton Park.

Berkeley Middle School is located in Berkeley. McCluer South-Berkeley High School is in Ferguson.

The Berkeley School District opened in 1937 after a dispute over where a school for black people should be located, with the black residents of southern Kinloch and the white residents of northern Kinloch opposing each other. The newly formed school district, mostly white, took over Kinloch High School, which had opened during that year; previously a part of the Kinloch School District, the high school was renamed Berkeley High School. The high school, located in what is now Berkeley, was exclusively for white students. At a later point a new Berkeley High School campus opened in a new location, and the former Berkeley High School became Berkeley Middle School. On June 7, 1975, a U.S. district court ordered the Ferguson-Florissant School District to annex the Berkeley School District and the Kinloch School District; therefore the Ferguson-Florissant district began to serve Berkeley. In December 2003 the former Berkeley High School closed due to expansion of Lambert-St. Louis Airport. In January 2004 McCluer South-Berkeley High School opened.

See also

 Washington Park Cemetery, a historical African-American cemetery in Berkeley

References

External links
 City of Berkeley official website

 
Cities in Missouri
Cities in St. Louis County, Missouri
1937 establishments in Missouri